The Twins is a 1923 Australian silent film directed Melbourne cinematographer Leslie McCallum. It is a rural farce-melodrama and is considered a lost film.

Plot
Characters from the country visit the city. Among the characters are a female vamp, who winds up committing suicide.

Cast
Ray Whiting and Jim Paxton as the twins
Cath McMicking as heroine
Aubrey Gibson as villain
Doreen Gale as vamp
Jim Doods as Horace Hothouse
Keith McHarg
Billy Begg
Norman Carlyon

Production
The film was made to raise funds for various charities including the Melbourne Women's Hospital. It was sponsored by Carlyon's ballroom in St Kilda; Norman Carlyon appeared in the cast and a fund raising ball was held on 19 June 1923.

Reception
According to contemporary reports, response to the film was positive and money was made from its release.

References

External links

The Twins at National Film and Sound Archive

1923 films
Australian drama films
Australian silent films
Australian black-and-white films
Lost Australian films
1923 drama films
1923 lost films
Lost drama films
Twins in fiction
Silent drama films
1920s English-language films